The 2016 Port Adelaide Football Club season was the club's 146th season since formation, the club's 139th season of senior competition and its 20th season in the Australian Football League (AFL). The club also fielded its reserves team in the SANFL.

Player list

AFL player list

SANFL player list

Playing list changes

The following summarises all player changes between the conclusion of the 2015 season and the beginning of the 2016 season.

In

Out

AFL season summary 
Bold indicates home game

Ladder

References

Port Adelaide Football Club Season, 2016
Port Adelaide Football Club seasons